Lukas Beck is an Austrian photographer who specialises in music and theatre.

Life and work
He has contributed to virtually all Austrian newspapers and magazines, as well as international papers, such as Die Zeit or The New York Times.

Beck was born in 1967, and educated at the University of Vienna, where he read ethnology.
His pictures, in a style all of their own, show a keen eye for detail, colour and light. His work has been shown in Vienna's Leopold Museum, the Westlicht Gallery and the Palais Coburg. Beck has published photo books on various subjects, and has created CD covers and posters. His work has had a deep impact on Austrian photography.

Beck's main focus is man and human nature. His often stunning colour portraits reveal a deep compassion and fondness for his subjects. He has portrayed, among others, the musicians Willi Resetarits and Hans Söllner, actors Dennis Hopper and Christopher Lee, singers Elina Garanca and Edita Gruberova, crime novelist Wolf Haas and a number of Austrian and international high-profile politicians, such as Mohamed ElBaradei.

In 1999, Beck was hired by the Vienna Boys' Choir to help change the choir's image; his unusual photos show the boys as living, breathing youngsters and display an unbridled sense of fun. In 2004, Beck published a photo book on the famous Austrian choir. Since 2003, he has been teaching photography at the ORF (=Austrian National Radio) summer academy.

Books
Beck (1993), Ostbahnkurti und die "Chefpartie", Edition Tau
Beck (2002), Räume in Bewegung, Springer Wien New York
Beck (2003), Luxus Shopping Guide – Vienna, EchoVerlag Wien
Beck (2004), Kurt Ostbahn und die Combo, NP Verlag St. Pölten
Beck (2004), Wiener Sängerknaben, NP Verlag St. Pölten
Beck (2004), Wien, Tradition und Moderne, Schmid Verlag Wien
Beck (2006), Hans Söllner – Bilderbuch, Trikont München
Beck (2008), Revanche 2008 Substance Media Wien
Beck (2010), Ausgezeichnetes Wien in 50 Portraits, Ueberreuter Verlag
Beck (2011), Leben im Zoo, Echomedia
Beck (2012), liebe grenzenlos, echomedia, 2012 />
Beck (2012), Filmgespraeche, Synema
Beck (2015), Stadtmenschen, Picus
Beck (2015), Das soziale Gesicht Europas, Falter Verlag
Beck (2020), Wien pur, Echomedia

Movies
2008: Be A Mensch, ORF
2008: MoZuluArt, Universal
2010: Faltenradio live, Hoanzl
2013: Schönbrunner Tiergeschichten - Leben im Zoo, Universum Doku, ORF
2015: Mehrstimmig - Die Wiener Sängerknaben, Doku, ORF
2016: Still, Doku, ORF

Solo exhibitions
1993: OstbahnKurti und die Chefpartie, Vindobona Wien
1995: AugenBlick, Donaufestival Krems
2002: Gehört gesehen Westlicht Wien
2004: Wiener Sängerknaben, Palais Coburg Wien
2004: Wien, Tradition und Moderne, Leopold Museum Wien
2008: Fußballkäfig international, Galerie Urbanart Wien
2015: "Protest", WAK Wien
2018: "Beckstage", Theater am Spittelberg Wien
2018: "Sie sollen nicht sagen können, sie hätten von nichts gewußt", Rotor Graz
2018: "Best of Lukas Beck", Messe Congress Wien
2021: "Wien pur", Galerie Lukas Feichtner

Awards
2003: Österreichischer Zeitschriftenpreis
2009: Lichtfarben 2009. Österreichischer Preis für interkulturelle Pressefotografie
2013: Matsalu Nature Film Festival, Special Prizes of the Tallinn Zoo
2014: International Independent Film Awards, Gold Award for Cinematography
2018: Goldene Gesellschaftsmedaille der Photographischen Gesellschaft

References
 Der Standard, (Austrian Daily)
 Der Standard, (Austrian Daily)
 Der Standard, (Austrian Daily)
 Der Standard, (Austrian Daily)
 Photographische Gesellschaft
 3 Sat Kulturzeit

External links
 official site
 photo gallery

Austrian photographers
Artists from Vienna
1967 births
Living people